The 1941 U.S. Open was the 45th U.S. Open, held June 5–7 at Colonial Country Club in Fort Worth, Texas. Craig Wood, who had lost in a playoff at the U.S. Open two years earlier, finally broke through and claimed his first U.S. Open title, three strokes ahead of runner-up Denny Shute in sweltering heat. Eight years earlier, Shute had defeated him in a playoff at the 1933 British Open.

Wood opened the tournament with a 73 in the first round and followed that up with a 71 in the rain-delayed second. Part of a four-way tie for the lead after 36 holes, Wood shot a pair of 70s in the final two rounds, capped by a birdie on the 72nd, to post a 284 total. Only Fort Worth's Ben Hogan managed better than Wood in the final two rounds, but he finished five behind in a tie for third. Denny Shute shot a 287 total to finish three strokes behind Wood in second.

Wood, age 39, was almost forced to miss the tournament due to a nagging back injury he aggravated two weeks earlier. After recording a double-bogey 7 on his first hole of the championship, he considered withdrawing but was convinced to continue by playing partner Tommy Armour. With his win here, Wood became the first to win the first two majors in a season; he won the Masters two months earlier. Prior to 1941, he had several near misses, and had lost all four majors in extra holes.

Tyrrell Garth, a month shy of his 16th birthday, established a new tournament record for youngest competitor. He shot an 80 in the first round and withdrew during the second; his record stood for 65 years, until 2006 (Tadd Fujikawa).

This was the last U.S. Open played for five years, until 1946, due to World War II.  Colonial has hosted an annual PGA Tour event since 1946, now known as the Fort Worth Invitational.

Course layout

Source:

Past champions in the field

Made the cut 

Source:

Missed the cut 

Source:

Round summaries

First round
Thursday, June 5, 1941

Source:

Second round
Friday, June 6, 1941

Thunderstorms caused delays in the morning and afternoon, but only a few players did not complete the second round on Friday.

Source:

Third round
Saturday, June 7, 1941  (morning)

Source:

Final round
Saturday, June 7, 1941  (afternoon)

Source:

References

External links 

USGA Championship Database
USOpen.com - 1941
2015 Crowne Plaza Invitational at Colonial Media Guide (page 77)

U.S. Open (golf)
Golf in Texas
Sports in Fort Worth, Texas
U.S. Open
U.S. Open (golf)
U.S. Open
U.S. Open (golf)